WJBQ (97.9 FM; Q97 dot 9) is a radio station in Portland, Maine, United States, which airs a CHR/Top 40 format. It transmits its signal from Gray, Maine, which can be heard throughout Southwestern Maine, and into portions of adjacent New Hampshire.

Initial history

In June 1960, the station first signed on as WLOB-FM, simulcast with co-owned 1310 WLOB.  Over time, WLOB-AM-FM became Portland's highest-rated Top 40 radio stations, although in those days, few people had FM radios and most were listening to 1310 WLOB.  WLOB AM and -FM were sold to Portland Broadcasting Corporation on March 3, 1965.  The AM and FM simulcast ended on March 1, 1971 when the two stations were acquired by separate companies.  WLOB (AM) went to Aurovideo Incorporated while still maintaining a Top 40 format.  Meanwhile, WLOB-FM went to Dirigo Communications Incorporation, changing call letters to WDCS-FM and switching to a classical music format.

WJBQ history
WJBQ debuted on July 15, 1974, as a 3,000-watt Top 40 station at 106.3 FM licensed to Scarborough, Maine, just outside Portland. It was simulcast with 1440 AM in nearby Westbrook, Maine.  The main competition for WJBQ-AM-FM was then Top 40 station 1310 AM WLOB, which was one of the highest rated Contemporary Hits stations in the country for a market the size of Portland.  In its first Arbitron ratings, WJBQ-AM-FM edged WLOB by about three points. As the audience shifted to FM from AM, it meant a gradual decline for WLOB.

WLOB's demise took a while, probably because it had the backing of legendary consultant Paul Drew protege Ron Foster and others.  Meanwhile, WJBQ was staffed by Wally Brine doing mornings (later at WROR-FM in Boston, now retired), Joe McMillan in middays (who went on to WHDH (now WEEI) in Boston and KABL in San Francisco), and Jeff Ryder in the afternoon slot (also the station's program director, who went on to WBBF-Rochester, New York and WOKY-Milwaukee).  By 1977, WLOB had changed formats to an older-targeted Adult Contemporary format.

In September 1980, WJBQ's owner John Bride swapped frequencies and formats with Portland classical music station WDCS on 97.9 FM. This would make WJBQ a full-power 50,000-watt facility, with the lower-rated classical programming moving to the 3,000-watt signal at 106.3.  The move proved to be profitable for WJBQ.  High-profile names like Andy Carey, Brian Phoenix, and Harry Nelson took turns as the station's program directors, and brought it continued high ratings.

In August 1986, Bride sold WJBQ in order to launch independent UHF TV station WPXT.  The new owner was former WJTO/WIGY owner Turner Porter, who launched an ambitious full-service adult contemporary format featuring Joe McMillan in morning drive and NBC Talknet at night and new call letters:  WWGT, or "The Great 98".  Jack O'Brien was imported from sister station WERZ in Exeter, New Hampshire as program director.  This "AM on FM" approach didn't garner the success that was hoped for, and the station changed format again in November 1987. The AC format was replaced with CHR as "G-98" with Jon Holiday as the programming consultant. Under Holiday's guidance, the station achieved ratings success and remained CHR as G-98 until 1991. Beginning that year, the station changed on-air slogans several times (as Ocean, Coast, etc.) with the WCSO calls as an AC for several years before returning to its Top 40 roots for a 3rd time and original WJBQ call letters in November 1996, under the ownership of Fuller-Jeffrey Radio.  Fuller-Jeffrey later sold the station to Citadel Broadcasting. Citadel merged with Cumulus Media on September 16, 2011.

On August 30, 2013, a deal was announced in which Townsquare Media would acquire 53 Cumulus stations, including WJBQ, for $238 million. The deal is part of Cumulus' acquisition of Dial Global.  Townsquare and Dial Global are both controlled by Oaktree Capital Management. The sale to Townsquare was completed on November 14, 2013.

References

External links
WJBQ Website

JBQ
Contemporary hit radio stations in the United States
Townsquare Media radio stations
Radio stations established in 1960